Trophon is a genus of sea snails, marine gastropod mollusks in the family Muricidae, the murex snails or rock snails.

Species
The following species are recognised in the genus Trophon:
 
Trophon albolabratus 
Trophon bahamondei 
Trophon barnardi 
Trophon beatum 
Trophon brevispira 
Trophon celebensis 
Trophon clenchi 
Trophon coulmanensis 
 † Trophon covacevichi Frassinetti, 2000 
Trophon distantelamellatus 
Trophon drygalskii 
Trophon geversianus 
 † Trophon huilliche Frassinetti, 2000 
Trophon iarae 
Trophon leptocharteres 
 † Trophon macharei DeVries, 2005 
Trophon mawsoni 
Trophon melvillsmithi 
Trophon minutus 
 † Trophon munitus 
Trophon nucelliformis 
Trophon ohlini 
 † Trophon parcus Frassinetti, 2000 
Trophon parodizi 
Trophon patagonicus 
Trophon paucilamellatus 
Trophon pelecetus 
Trophon pelseneeri 
Trophon plicatus 
Trophon purdyae 
†Trophon sowerbyi 
Trophon triacanthus 
 † Trophon vetulus Frassinetti, 2000

References

 Vaught, K.C. (1989). A classification of the living Mollusca. American Malacologists: Melbourne, FL (USA). . XII, 195 pp.

 
Muricidae